The color sunset is a pale tint of orange.  It is a representation of the average color of clouds when the sunlight from a sunset is reflected from them.

The first recorded use of sunset as a color name in English was in 1916.

Origin

Variations of sunset

Sunglow

The color sunglow is displayed at right.

The first recorded use of sunglow as a color name in English was in 1924. The Crayola crayon color was formulated in 1990.

Sunray

At right is displayed the color sunray.

The first recorded use of sunray as a color name in English was in 1926.

Sunset orange

The color sunset orange is displayed at right. 

Sunset orange was formulated as a Crayola color in 1997.

Sun colors in human culture
Interior Design
  Sunset is popular color in interior design which is used when a pale warm tint is desired.

Sports
  Sunset orange is used on the NBA's Oklahoma City Thunder alternative jerseys introduced in the 2015-16 season. They are primarily worn on Sunday matchups.

References

See also

 List of colors

Shades of orange